The 1916 Georgia Bulldogs football team represented the University of Georgia during the 1916 Southern Intercollegiate Athletic Association football season. Led by seventh-year head coach W. A. Cunningham, the Bulldogs compiled an overall record of 6–3 with a mark of 5–2 in SIAA play. Tom Thrash was the team captain.

Schedule

Game summaries

The Citadel
To open the season, Georgia gave The Citadel the team's only loss

Clemson
In the second week of play, Georgia beat Clemson.

Florida

Sources:

Georgia beat the winless Florida Gators 21–0 in Athens. The contest was scoreless in the first half. Georgia had to send in two stars who were resting with dislocated shoulders. Walter Neville scored the game's first touchdown.

The starting lineup was Pew (left end), Thrash (left tackle), Ferguson (left guard), Garmany (center), Beaseley (right guard), Wingate (right tackle), Tate (right end), Dessendorff (quarterback), Coleman (left halfback), McLaws (right halfback), Neville (fullback).

Virginia
Georgia beat Virginia for the first time in 1916.

Navy
The year's first loss came in Georgia's first game against Navy.

Auburn
Beginning in 1916 and continuing until 1958, Georgia and Auburn played every game except one in Columbus, Georgia at the A. J. McClung Memorial Stadium. Coach Cunningham was the key to getting this series located at the neutral location in Columbus.

Furman
The Bulldogs beat Furman.

Georgia Tech

Sources:

Georgia loss to rival Georgia Tech 21–0 in Tech's only road game. After a scoreless first quarter, Talley Johnston ran for 25 yards around right end, and plunges from Tommy Spence soon got a touchdown. In the third quarter, Spence scored again. Tech was then aided by a half-the-distance-to-the-goal penalty by Georgia. The drive ended with a 15–yard touchdown run from Everett Strupper. The starting lineup was: Tate (left end), Thrash (left tackle), Wingate (left guard), Garmany (center), Beasley (right guard), McConnell (right tackle), Dexendorf (right end), Donnelly (quarterback),  McLaws (left halfback),  Reynolds (right halfback), and Neville (fullback).

Alabama
Georgia beat Alabama 3–0. William Donnelly made a kick from placement. The starting lineup was Neville (left end), Thrash (left tackle), Garmany (left guard), Pew (center), Wingate (right guard), McConnell (right tackle), Tate (right end), Donnelly (quarterback), Coleman (left halfback), Moore (right halfback), Dezendorff (fullback).

References

Georgia
Georgia Bulldogs football seasons
Georgia Bulldogs football